Isabella is a feminine given name, which is the Latinised form of Hebrew Elisheba (whence also Elizabeth) or the Latinised form of Jezebel (אִיזֶבֶל‎, ʾĪzével, ʾĪzeḇel). It is common in Italy and seventh most popular name for all newborn girls in the United States in 2021. It is particularly well used for Hispanic girls. Isabella was among the five most popular names for Hispanic newborn girls in the American state of Virginia in 2022. Diminutive name: Bella
It may refer to:

People

Royalty
 Queen Isabella (disambiguation), the name of many queens
 Isabella of Aragon (disambiguation)
 Isabella of Castile (disambiguation)
 Isabella of France (disambiguation)
 Isabella, Countess of Atholl, ban-mormaer of Atholl, Scotland, 1211–1236/7
 Isabella, Countess of Menteith (1217–1272)
 Isabella of Mar (c. 1277–1296), first wife of Robert the Bruce
 Isabella of France (1295–1358), Queen consort of England as the wife of Edward II of England
 Isabella, Countess of Brienne (1306–1360), Countess of Lecce and Brienne
 Isabella of Valois, Duchess of Bourbon (1313–1388), wife of Peter I, Duke of Bourbon
 Isabella, Countess of Fife (c.1320–1389) 
 Isabella, Countess of Bedford (1332–1379), daughter of King Edward III of England
 Isabella, Countess of Foix (c.1361-1428), Viscountess of Béarn 
 Isabella, Duchess of Lorraine (1400–1453), Queen of Naples
 Isabella of Bourbon (1436–1465), Countess Consort of Charolais
 Isabella I of Castile (1451–1504, "Queen Isabella of Spain"), Queen of Castile and León, wife of Ferdinand II of Aragon
 Isabella of Aragon, Queen of Portugal (1470–1498), Princess of Asturias
 Isabella of Aragon, Duchess of Milan (1470–1524), Princess of Naples, Duchess Consort of Milan
 Isabella d'Este (1474-1539), Marchesa of Mantua
 Isabella II of Spain (1830-1904), queen regnant of Spain from 1843 until 1868
 Isabella, Princess of Asturias (1851–1931), daughter of Queen Isabella II
 Princess Isabella of Denmark (born 2007), daughter of Crown Prince Frederick and Crown Princess Mary of Denmark

Other
 Isabella Acres (born 2001), American actress
 Isabella Andreini, 16th-century Italian actress and writer
 Izabella Alvarez, American actress
 Isabella Arcila (born 1994), Colombian swimmer
 Isabella Belfer, oldest woman imprisoned in Israel
 Isabella Bird, 19th-century English explorer, writer, and a natural historian
 Isabella Blake-Thomas (born 2002), British voice actress
 Isabella Boylston, American ballet dancer who currently performs as a soloist with the American Ballet Theatre
 Isabella Campbell, Countess Cawdor (b. 1966), British fashion editor
 Isabella Cramp, American voice actress
 Isabelle Foerder (born 1979), paralympic athlete from Germany
 Bella French Swisher (1837–1893), writer
 Isabella Hadid, known as Bella Hadid (born 1996), American model 
 Isabella Isaksen (born 1993), modern pentathlete from the United States
 Isabella Jobson (1878 - 1943), Australian nurse who served in World War I
 Isabella Leong (born 1988), Macanese actress and former singer
 Isabella Menin (born 1996), Brazilian model and beauty queen
 Isabella Molyneux, Countess of Sefton (1748–1819), British peeress
 Isabella di Morra, Italian poet
 Isabella Rossellini (born 1952), Italian actress, filmmaker, author, philanthropist, and model
 Isabella Santoni (born 1995), Brazilian actress
 Isabella Vincent (born 2006), Australian Paralympic swimmer

Fictional characters 
 Isabella Parigi a character from The Lizzie McGuire Movie 
 Isabella, a stock character in Italian comedy
 Isabella, leading character in Gioachino Rossini's opera L'italiana in Algeri
 Isabella (Is for short), in the film Read It and Weep
 Isabella, in Measure for Measure by William Shakespeare
 Isabella, in Orlando Furioso by Torquato Tasso
 Isabella Linton, Edgar Linton's sister in Wuthering Heights by Emily Brontë
 Isabella Thorpe, a character in Northanger Abbey by Jane Austen
 Isabella Knightley, Emma's sister in Emma by Jane Austen
 Isabella Mongoose, a minor character from the Sonic the Hedgehog comic series by Archie Comics.
 Isabella Garcia-Shapiro, a main character in the Disney Channel series, Phineas and Ferb
 Isabella Marquez, one of Dora's two baby twins and a character in Dora the Explorer
 Isabella "Bella" Swan, protagonist of the Twilight series  by Stephenie Meyer
 Isabella, daughter of Mia Jones in the show Degrassi: The Next Generation
 Daisuke "Isabella" Yamamoto, a character in the manga series Paradise Kiss by Ai Yazawa
 Belle Black, a former character on the American soap opera Days of our Lives
 Isabella Braña Williams, a former character on the American soap opera The Young and the Restless
 Isabella "Bella" Hartley, from H2O: Just Add Water
 Isabella "Izzy" Fuentes, from I'm in the Band
 Isabella "Ivy" Valentine, from Soulcalibur
 Isabella Yang, fiancée of Jean-Jacques Leroy from the anime  Yuri!!! on Ice
 Isabella (comics), the title character of an Italian comic book series
 Isabella, a character from the video games series Crash Bandicoot, first introduced in Crash Team Racing.
 Isabella, a character from the manga and anime series The Promised Neverland
 Agent Isabella Molina, an undercover cop in Rush Hour 2

See also
 Isabel
 Zabel
 
 Jezebel

References

Feminine given names
English feminine given names
Italian feminine given names